Henry Chesewell (died 1433), of Totnes, Devon, was an English politician. Outside of politics, he is believed to have been a shopkeeper dealing in victuals.

He was a Member (MP) of the Parliament of England for Totnes in December 1421 and 1422.

References

Year of birth missing
1433 deaths
English MPs December 1421
Members of the Parliament of England (pre-1707) for Totnes
English MPs 1422